Dr Nikola Vukčević (Serbian Cyrillic: др Никола Вукчевић) was a Montenegrin historian and ethnologist. He died suddenly in Belgrade on 30 January 1982, leaving his life's greatest work "The Lješanska nahija" unfinished and never published.

Works 
 An Appendix to the Tradition in Montenegro (Један прилог традицији у Црној Гори), Belgrade, 1971
 Some Issues in the History of Montenegro (Осврт на нека питања из историје Црне Горе), Belgrade, 1981
 A Worthy Book on the Montenegrins (Вриједна књига о Црногорцима), Cetinje, 1981
 Ethnic Origin of the Montenegrins (Етничко поријекло Црногораца), Belgrade, 1981

1982 deaths
Montenegrin historians
Year of birth missing